Knud Børge Overgaard (21 March 1918 – 20 October 1985) was a Danish amateur footballer who played 8 games for the Denmark national football team, and won a bronze medal at the 1948 Summer Olympics. He played his club football with B.93.

Overgaard was an excellent wing half-back with good physicality and tackling ability. He started his career with Aarhus club AGF, but was not selected for the Danish national team, until he moved to Copenhagen club B.93. Overgaard got his international debut for Denmark in 1945, but had to compete with Børge Mathiesen, Ivan Jensen, and Viggo Jensen for the wing half-back spot. Just before the 1948 Summer Olympics, regular Danish defender Knud Bastrup-Birk was injured, and Overgaard was moved out of position to cover as a full-back. In a defensive pairing with Viggo Jensen, the two out-of-position players did better than expected, and Denmark won bronze medals at the tournament. Following the Olympics, Overgaard's international career ended.

References

1918 births
1985 deaths
Association football defenders
Danish men's footballers
Olympic footballers of Denmark
Footballers at the 1948 Summer Olympics
Olympic bronze medalists for Denmark
Olympic medalists in football
Boldklubben af 1893 players
Footballers from Aarhus
Medalists at the 1948 Summer Olympics